Masters W35 shot put world record progression is the progression of world record improvements of the shot put W35 division of Masters athletics.  Records must be set in properly conducted, official competitions under the standing IAAF rules unless modified by World Masters Athletics.  

The W35 division consists of female athletes who have reached the age of 35 but have not yet reached the age of 40, so exactly from their 35th birthday to the day before their 40th birthday. The W35 division throws exactly the same 4 kg implement as the Women's Open division.  These competitors all threw their records in open competition.  Krachevskaya's records were set in the run-up to the Olympics, culminating in the silver medal at the 1980 Olympics.  Peleshenko set her record a month before winning the silver medal at the 2000 Olympics.  Olympians all, Ivanova is the only one on this list not to win an Olympic medal.

Key

References

Masters Athletics Shot Put list
All Time Athletics

Masters athletics world record progressions
Shot